Baton twirling involves using the body to spin a metal rod in a coordinated routine. It is similar to rhythmic gymnastics or color guard.

Description
Twirling combines dance, agility, coordination and flexibility  while manipulating a single baton or multiple batons. It is a sport that is played worldwide. A performance is typically accompanied by music. There are multiple types of baton twirlers. Majorettes twirl in a group for a high school or college with its marching band. A twirler may perform as part of a group which marches in a parade or in front of an audience. Competitive twirlers may compete solo or as part of a group. Twirlers start learning the skills as early as age 2, but usually in grade school age, although some begin as late as high school age.

Baton twirling requires specific knowledge of how to manipulate the baton and where to hold the baton.  The baton can be described as a rod, usually a lightweight metal such as aluminum, with weighted, resilient ends, typically rubber.  The baton's rubber ends attach to the rod and can be replaced.  On one end, there is a large tip that is called the ball. On the other end, there is a small tip simply called the tip. The baton must be balanced at its center point. The rod can be one of several thicknesses. Thicker, heavier rods are said to be better for rolling, while thinner ones are better for finger rolls.  The rubber ends can have different designs or weights depending on the manufacturer. Common types are the star, tulip and simple round tips.  The length of the baton from tip to tip should be one inch longer than the distance from the user's armpit to the tip of the user's middle finger. The baton is manipulated from three positions, depending on the trick: from the ball, one hand from the tip, and mostly from the center of the baton.  The rod of the baton wrapped with tape, either for decoration or for added grip, using tape specially employed for that purpose. The tape can be anything from electrical tape to tennis tape.

In addition to twirling baton(s), twirlers are known for manipulating multiple pieces of equipment including fire baton(s), machetes, fire machetes, hoop baton, streamer, flag baton, swing baton, rifle, lighted baton, double flag baton, and sabers. All equipment that is used by twirlers of the NBTA, USTA, and WBTF are show quality pieces of equipment that are engineered to be easily manipulated in a twirling routine. Therefore, the rifle, sabre, and machetes are not real weapons, as they are props created specifically for twirling. However, fire batons are, in fact, real flaming batons. The twirler will soak the ends of the fire batons overnight in a flammable substance, commonly kerosene, tiki oil, or gasoline. After the ends have finished soaking, it is important that the twirler shakes off any excess liquid. Finally, the ends of the baton can be set on fire using a lighter. After the twirler has finished performing, the flames can be put out through tossing the baton very fast and hard or by placing it in a fire blanket.

Baton twirling requires skillful coordination and extraordinary control of the human body. Additionally, it requires a great amount of flexibility in order to properly execute baton, dance, and gymnastics elements.

The foundation of baton twirling is the thumb toss.  This trick is accomplished from the middle of the baton.  The baton is held in one hand at the waist.  The baton is rolled over the thumb and a slight hand movement lifts it into the air.  The thumb toss can be increased in difficulty with one or more spins done under the toss, cartwheels, front walkovers, illusions or many more tricks.  The baton can be tosses from either hand, but proficiency in both hands is preferable.  The baton can be caught blind behind the head, at the side, under a kick, under one or both legs or in an illusion. Other tosses include the open hand toss and flat spin toss.

The sport of baton twirling has many tricks common to all twirlers.  The elbow roll is a common trick. Continuous elbow rolls go over one elbow, dip, go over the second elbow, dip at the back, and over the first elbow again.  This process can keep going as long as the baton stays in motion.  Other common tricks include fishtails, open throats, open neck rolls, mouth rolls and more.

The routines have a predictable pattern of organization, despite a unique organization of tricks based on ability.  Typically, the twirler has an initial routine constructed in each type of routine as they are ready.  That routine is changed over and over during the course of their career. In Basic March, the twirler places one hand on their left hip and cradles the baton in the other.  The twirler lifts the leg up into a chair height bend leg and lowers the foot back to the ground to the beat of "Stars and Stripes".  Strut is an expansion off of Basic March.  It also counts the hitting of the foot off the ground based on the beat of "Stars and Stripes", but other dance moves w/ the coordinated baton are incorporated into its X pattern. Solo routines don't have a specific music or beat to follow.  The twirler attempts to constantly improve the routine with greater consistent speed, difficult tricks and improved bodywork.  The routine has specific sections from the vertical, horizontal, finger and roll sections.  It can include a walk up and walk back with poses, but the walk can be a Tour Jete, leaps, skip, Step ball changes or a simple march. Modeling is completed in a T pattern with slow, graceful spins/turns. The routine can be done in a short/party/long dress or costume depending on contest rules.  Modeling can also include an interview depending on the contest.  Other routines can include 2 baton, 3 baton, flag baton, show routine or hoop.  Pageants are a large part of competitive baton twirling.  Basic Skills pageants are the introductory level where the contestant performs Basic March, Modeling and Solo.  Beginner and Intermediate pageants include Modeling/Interview, Strut and Solo.  Advanced pageants include Modeling/Interview, Show twirl, and solo.

Baton twirlers perform at football games, basketball games, competitions, parades, and other events where entertainment is needed.  It is commonly known that after a twirling season has come to an end, each twirling company/studio will host a recital to showcase the talents obtained over the season.

Competitive solo twirlers in the United States compete through several organizations.  These organization include United States Twirling Association, Twirling Unlimited, Twirltacular, National Baton Twirling Association and more.  Each of these organizations has its own rules. The United States Twirling Association (USTA) offers competitive routines that are unique to this association only. Moreover, these routines include L military marching, 32 count presentation, rhythm twirl, freestyle, and show twirl. Twirling Unlimited, TU, has restrictions on number of turns and continuous elbow rolls in developmental levels, but they allow gymnastics moves.  TU separates the age groups as 0-6, 7-8, 9-11, 12-14, 15+. The 0-6 and 7-8 age groups are combined for certain events. National Baton Twirling Association, NBTA, does not have developmental restrictions, but it does not permit gymnastics.  NBTA age groups are 0-4, 0-6, 7-9, 10-12. 13-15, 16+.  NBTA nations are called America's Youth on Parade, which has been held for 50 years.  AYOP has been held at Notre Dame's Joyce Center for 46 years. The event allows the soloists and groups to qualify for world competition.  AYOP is a week long event with a mixture of open events and pageants, which the twirler has to qualify for at Miss Majorette state/regional events.  The solo events of both organizations are also divided into Novice, Beginner, Intermediate, Advanced, and Elite levels.  Advancement is based on a set number of wins.

History

Baton twirling started in Western Europe and Asia. The sport came to North America when Major Reuben Webster Millsaps created baton twirling when he established Millsaps College in Mississippi after the US Civil War.

While many member countries have their own national organizations, at the world level, three governing bodies are recognized: 
the World Baton Twirling Federation (WBTF), the World Twirling Association (WTA), and The Global Alliance of National Baton Twirling & Majorette Associations (NBTA). The WBTF and NBTA host World Championships and International Cup (WBTF), while the WTA continues to honor the origins of the sport with additional events that WBTF does not include. The WTA was founded in 1960, by champion baton twirler Victor Faber.

Founded in 1977, current member countries of the WBTF include Australia, Belgium, Brazil, Canada, Catalonia (Spain), Croatia, England, France, Germany, Hungary, Ireland, Italy, Japan, Netherlands, Norway, Philippines, Scotland, Seychelles, Slovenia, South Africa, Sweden, Switzerland, and the United States.

Current member countries of the NBTA include Belgium, Bulgaria, Canada, Croatia, Czech Republic, England, France, Germany, the Netherlands, Ireland, Italy, Norway, Romania, Russia, Scotland, Slovenia, Spain, Switzerland, Ukraine, and the United States. Under consideration are: Australia, Estonia, Japan, Slovenia, and South Africa.

Competitive baton twirling
Competitive baton twirling is classified by two factors, skill and age. The NBTA, USTA, and WBTF separate twirlers by their skill levels, which range from novice, beginner, intermediate, to advanced; advancement to the next skill level is determined through the number of first place wins that the twirler has accomplished against other twirlers.
Wins obtained with no competitors in said division typically do not count towards advancement.  Next, the twirlers are classified by their age through a standard scale that is as follows:  0-6 7-9 10-12 13-15 16-21 22+.  This classification scale ensures that the competition between twirlers in each division is fair.

When competing, a twirlers attire will typically be a leotard or a skater dress that is embellished with sequins, rhinestones, fringe, and other ornate designs. Twirlers are judged on their attire during competition, especially in events such as best in costume, so it is important that they wear a costume that fits properly and looks good during competition. Footwear ranges from instep cougars,  jazz shoes, to  majorette boots. Typically, instep cougars are seen on both the competition floor and during practice. Jazz shoes are primarily used during competition, as the soft bottoms can easily be torn during practice. It is common to see the heels of jazz shoes covered in rhinestones. Majorette boots can be seen during competition; however, high school and college majorettes typically wear these on the football field and during other performances.

One of the most competitive titles in the twirling field, Miss Majorette, is a title that is given to the top baton twirlers of each state. As mentioned earlier, twirlers will be classified based on their skill and age, which allows for a Miss Majorette title in each rank. When competing for this title, twirlers will begin by competing in T or Circle T Modelling, Interview, Solo, and X- Strut. After a twirler has been named Miss Majorette of their state, they will advance to compete for the title of Miss Majorette of America in their division.

Every year, the ESPN Wide World of Sports hosts Twirlmania international championship competition at Walt Disney World. Competition is available for soloists, teams, high schools, colleges, and recreational groups of any age or gender. Some countries that have participated in the past include U.S, Japan, Russia, Australia, and England. Competing ranges from baton twirling to pompom and dance. Competitors also get to march in a Disney parade as well as participate in a fun, family oriented weekend. Awards range from trophies to plush stuffed animals to cash (up to $4,000) and gifts by sponsors. Some categories include Dance Line Team, Collegiate Team, Pom Pom Team, Drill Team, Basic & Military, and Miss Twirl Mania Pageant, to name a few.

The World Championships have the following events:
Freestyle Senior Women & Men
Junior Women and Men 
Event accompanied by a compulsory/short programme event
strut
solo
dancetwirl
pairs
trios
show choir
Single baton, 2 batons, 3 batons

Teams, pairs, trios, and show choir can be co-ed.

For several years, the powerhouse countries (France, Italy, Japan, and the United States) have dominated the world championships. In order to promote more events and other smaller countries' ability to have international champions, the International Cup was introduced. Athletes are categorized into B-level athletes, A-level athletes, and elite. The power house countries don't take B-level athletes so as to the give the smaller countries an opportunity to have international champions. Because every country doesn't have dancetwirl as an event, and because of the variety within the freestyle event, the artistic twirl was introduced to replace freestyle and dancetwirl at the International Cup.

Since 2005, the two competitions have been run concurrently over a week. In 2009, the competitions began running separately, with the International Cup falling on uneven years and the World Championships on even years. New events such as Freestyle and Pairs across different age levels and divisions were added to the International Cup.

The following cities have previously hosted the competitions:

Solo one baton to music, novice beginner intermediate advanced (levels) 0-6 7-9 10-12 13-15 16+
Two baton to music, novice beginner intermediate advanced 0-6 7-9 10-12 13-15 16+
Showtwirl multiple batons with a prop and music novice beginner intermediate advanced 0-6 7-9 10-12 13-15 16+
Basic march novice beginner intermediate advanced 0-6 7-9 10-12 13-15 16+
Military march novice beginner intermediate advanced 0-6 7-9 10-12 13-15 16+
Modeling novice beginner intermediate advanced 0-6 7-9 10-12 13-15 16+
Events and age divisions and levels may vary due to baton association.

International Cup

Special Athlete's Award
In 1998, the WBTF introduced the Special Athlete's Award of Recognition for athletes that competed at 10+ World Championships. Not all are Champions.

References

External links

 World Baton Twirling Federation
 Confédération Européenne de Twirling Bâton
 United States Baton Twirling Association
 National Baton Twirling Association
https://wfnbta.com/

Individual sports
Circus skills
Twirling
Cheerleading
Articles containing video clips